Wilhelm Möllenkamp (2 April 1858, Aurich - 29 November 1917, Nordern)  was a German entomologist who specialised in Coleoptera especially Lucanidae.

Möllenkamp was an insect  dealer in Dortmund. He wrote many short scientific papers describing new taxa, many in Insekten-Börse a part scientific part trade entomological journal published by Alfred Kernen in Stuttgart.

External links
BioNica Partial Bibliography

German entomologists
1858 births
1917 deaths